The Yamaha YZ 85  is a motorcycle designed specifically for off-road and Motorcross racing.
85
It is powered by an 84.7 cc single-cylinder, water-cooled, two-stroke, reed valve inducted engine and uses a 6-speed, constant-mesh, manual gearbox; with a multi-plate, wet-clutch. There are two wheel options – large wheel, with a 19-inch front and 16-inch rear; and  small wheel, with a 17-inch front and 14-inch rear. It weighs 157 lbs (wet).

References

Yamaha motorcycles
Two-stroke motorcycles

sv:Yamaha YZ85